The empresses of the Yuan dynasty of China were mainly of Mongol ethnicity, with the exception of Empress Gi who was previously a Kongnyo from Goryeo. Empress Gwon who also came from Goryeo later became the empress consort of Biligtü Khan Ayushiridara of Northern Yuan dynasty.

List of Yuan empress consorts
 1260–1281: Chabi (察必), empress to Kublai Khan (Emperor Shizu of Yuan)
 1283–1294: Nambui (南必), second empress to Kublai Khan (Emperor Shizu of Yuan)
 1295–1299: Shirindari (失怜答里), empress to Temür Khan (Emperor Chengzong of Yuan)
 1295–1307: Bulugan (卜魯罕), second empress to Temür Khan (Emperor Chengzong of Yuan)
 1310–1311: Zhenge (真哥), empress to Külüg Khan (Emperor Wuzong of Yuan)
 1313–1320: Radnashiri (阿納失失里), empress to Ayurbarwada Buyantu Khan (Emperor Renzong of Yuan)
 1321–1323: Sugabala (速哥八剌), empress to Gegeen Khan (Emperor Yingzong of Yuan)
 1324–1328: Babukhan (八不罕), empress to Yesün Temür (Taiding Emperor of Yuan)
 1328–1329: Budashiri (卜答失里), empress to Jayaatu Khan Tugh Temür (Emperor Wenzong of Yuan, first time)
 1329–1329: Babusha (八不沙), empress to Khutughtu Khan Kusala (Emperor Mingzong of Yuan)
 1329–1332: Budashiri (卜答失里), empress to Jayaatu Khan Tugh Temür (Emperor Wenzong of Yuan, second time)
 1332–1332: Daliyetemishi (答里也忒迷失), empress to Rinchinbal Khan (Emperor Ningzong of Yuan)
 1333–1335: Danashri (答納失里), empress to Toghon Temür (Emperor Huizong of Yuan)
 1337–1365: Bayan Khutugh (伯顏忽都), empress to Toghon Temür (Emperor Huizong of Yuan)
 1365–1370: Empress Gi (奇皇后), empress to Toghon Temür (Emperor Huizong of Yuan)

Empresses who were granted their titles posthumously:
 1336: Mailaiti, mother of Toghon Temür (Emperor Huizong of Yuan)

Gallery

See also
 List of Yuan emperors
 List of Mongol khatuns
 List of consorts of rulers of China

References

Yuan dynasty empresses
Yuan empress consorts
Yuan